The Auriga Nunataks are a small group of nunataks in Palmer Land, Antarctica, located  east of Wade Point at the head of Bertram Glacier. The highest of these rises to a sharp peak and is visible for a great distance. They were named by the UK Antarctic Place-Names Committee after the constellation of Auriga.

References
 

Nunataks of Palmer Land